Jiří Magál (born 11 April 1977 in Chrudim) is a Czech cross-country skier. Magál has appeared in four Winter Olympics and at every World Championship since 1999.

Career

World Championship finishes
Magál's highest finish in the World Championships was in 2003, where he finished in 7th in the team event.

Other events
He made his World Cup debut in the 1998 season in a race in Val di Fiemme, Italy. In World Cups, his highest finish is 3rd, which he achieved in the 2007 season in a race in Gaellivare and the 2008 season in a race in Falun. He has also won the 10 km and pursuit races in the 2009 Slavic Cup in his homeland.

Outside competitions
Magál is a sports instructor by profession, and lives in Krnov. In his free time he enjoys travelling, bowling and films.

Cross-country skiing results
All results are sourced from the International Ski Federation (FIS).

Olympic Games
 1 medal – (1 bronze)

World Championships

World Cup

Season standings

Team podiums

3 podiums – (3 )

References

External links

 
 
 
 
 

1977 births
Living people
Czech male cross-country skiers
Tour de Ski skiers
Olympic cross-country skiers of the Czech Republic
Olympic bronze medalists for the Czech Republic
Olympic medalists in cross-country skiing
Cross-country skiers at the 1998 Winter Olympics
Cross-country skiers at the 2002 Winter Olympics
Cross-country skiers at the 2006 Winter Olympics
Cross-country skiers at the 2010 Winter Olympics
Cross-country skiers at the 2014 Winter Olympics
Medalists at the 2010 Winter Olympics
People from Chrudim
Sportspeople from the Pardubice Region